Lothar is a Danish, Finnish, German, Norwegian, and Swedish masculine given name, while Lotár is a Hungarian masculine given name. Both names are modern forms of the Germanic Chlothar (which is a blended form of Hlūdaz, meaning "fame", and Harjaz, meaning "army"). Notable people with this name include:

Surname
 Ernst Lothar (1890–1974), Moravian-Austrian writer
 Hanns Lothar or Hanns Lothar Neutze (1929–1967), German actor
 Mark Lothar (1902–1985), German composer
 Rudolf Lothar (1865–1943), Hungarian-born Austrian writer
 Susanne Lothar (1960–2012), German actress

Given name

 Lothar Ahrendt (born 1936), former interior minister of the German Democratic Republic
 Lothar Albrich (1905–1978), Romanian hurdler
 Lothar Baumgarten (1944–2018), German artist
 Lothar Berg (1930–2015), German mathematician 
 Lothar Bolz (1903–1986), East German politician
 Lothar-Günther Buchheim (1918–2007), German author
 Lothar Collatz (1910–1990), German mathematician
 Lothar Dräger (1927–2016), German comic writer
 Lothar Emmerich (1941–2003), German football player and manager 
 Lothar von Faber (1817–1896), German industrialist
 Lothar Forcart (1902–1990), Swiss zoologist
 Lothar Geisler (1936–2019), German football player
 Lothar Hause (born 1955), East German football player
 Lothar Kreyssig, German bureaucrat and opposer of Aktion T4
 Lothar Kurbjuweit (born 1950), East German football player
 Lothar Lindtner (1917–2005), Norwegian actor
 Lothar Machtan (born 1949), German historian, writer
 Lothar Malskat (1913–1988), German painter and art restorer 
 Lothar Matthäus (born 1961), German football player and manager, 1990 World Cup winner
 Lothar Matthes (born 1947), German diver 
 Lothar de Maizière (born 1940), last Prime Minister of East Germany (1990)
 Lothar Meggendorfer (1847–7 July 1925), German illustrator
 Lothar Meyer (1830–1895), German chemist
 Lothar Mendes (1894–1974), German screenwriter and film director
 Lothar Metz (1939–2021), German wrestler and Olympic medalist
 Lothar Milde (born 1934), East German athlete who competed mainly in the discus throw
 Lothar Müthel (1896–1964), German stage and film actor and director
 Lothar Osterburg (born 1961), German artist
 Lothar Rendulic (1887–1971), Austrian Nazi General in the Wehrmacht, one of the principal commanders of Courland Pocket, Lapland War, Continuation War, Operation Kutuzov and Prague Offensive
 Lothar von Richthofen (1894–1922), fighter ace and younger brother of top-scoring ace Manfred von Richthofen (the Red Baron)
 Lothar Sippel (born 1965), German football player
 Lothar Späth (1937–2016), German politician 
 Lothar Spranger, East German footballer
 Lothar von Trotha (1848–1920), a German military commander who instigated the Herero massacre
 Lothar Ulsaß (1940–1999), German football player
 Lothar Wolleh (1930–1979), German photographer

Fictional characters 
 Lothar – comic character, sidekick to Mandrake the Magician created by Lee Falk
 Lothar – a gatekeeper in the 2016 Indian film Mohenjo Daro
 Lothar – a Nazi spy for Germany, sidekick to Nazi spy Neville Sinclair in the Rocketeer
 Lothar - character in E. T. A. Hoffmann's The Sandman
 Lothar Weiser – a spy for Socialist East Germany in Arnaldur Indriðason's book, The Draining Lake
 Anduin Lothar – a historical warrior in the Warcraft Universe
 Lothar – a robot in The Metabarons
 Lothar – a powerful Planewalker wizard in the Planescape setting for Dungeons & Dragons, likewise appearing in the game Planescape: Torment

See also 

 Luther (disambiguation)
 Ludwig (disambiguation)
Lotar (name)
 Louis

References

Masculine given names
Danish masculine given names
Finnish masculine given names
German masculine given names
Norwegian masculine given names
Swedish masculine given names
Surnames from given names
als:Chlothar
new:लोथार
pt:Lothar
ru:Лотарь